Lumor Agbenyenu (born 15 August 1996), commonly known as Lumor, is a Ghanaian professional footballer who plays as a left-back.

Club career

Early career
As a youngster growing up in native Ghana, Lumor Agbenyenu played in the [.C.|Wassaman Utd]] schools and was an international for Ghana youngsters. In July 2014, Lumor finally had the opportunity of going to European football when he was loaned to FC Porto, playing for a season in the Junior team.

Portimonense move and loan to 1860 Munich
In the following season after impressing in the junior teams of Porto, he loaned again to Portimonense and eventually in February 2016 exerted the option to buy the rights of the young left back.
In January 2017 he was loaned to 1860 Munich of the 2. Bundesliga, where he played regularly, but at the end of the season he returned to Portimonense after making his debut in Ghana's main national team.

Sporting CP
In January 2018, when Lumor was being negotiated by PSV Eindhoven, Sporting CP anticipated and secured the contest of the Ghanaian player, securing 50% of the economic rights of his pass for €2.5 million with the possibility of acquiring in the future another 30% for a value stipulated in €1 million. Lumor signed a long-term contract with Sporting CP, with the goal of replacing the Argentinian Jonathan Silva that had been loaned to AS Roma.

Loans to Göztepe and Mallorca
On 31 July 2019, after a six-month loan spell at Göztepe, Lumor joined La Liga side Mallorca also in a temporary deal. He featured regularly before returning to his parent club Sporting in July 2020, but spent the entire campaign without playing.

Aris
On 30 July 2021, Lumor joined Aris on a two-year deal.

Málaga
On 19 October 2022, he returned to Spain after signing a one-year contract with Málaga in Segunda División, after a trial period. He had his contract terminated by the club due to "disciplinary reasons" the following 15 March, after just three matches.

International career
Agbenyenu made his debut for the Ghana national team in a 5–0 2019 Africa Cup of Nations qualification win over Ethiopia on 11 June 2017.

Career statistics

Club

International

Honours
Sporting
Taça da Liga: 2018–19
Taça de Portugal: 2018–19

References

External links
 
 
 

Living people
1996 births
Footballers from Accra
Ghanaian footballers
Ghana international footballers
Association football defenders
Emmanuel Stars F.C. players
FC Porto players
Portimonense S.C. players
Sporting CP footballers
TSV 1860 Munich players
Göztepe S.K. footballers
RCD Mallorca players
Aris Thessaloniki F.C. players
Málaga CF players
2. Bundesliga players
Primeira Liga players
Süper Lig players
La Liga players
Super League Greece players
Ghanaian expatriate footballers
Ghanaian expatriate sportspeople in Germany
Ghanaian expatriate sportspeople in Portugal
Ghanaian expatriate sportspeople in Turkey
Ghanaian expatriate sportspeople in Spain
Ghanaian expatriate sportspeople in Greece
Expatriate footballers in Germany
Expatriate footballers in Portugal
Expatriate footballers in Turkey
Expatriate footballers in Spain
Expatriate footballers in Greece
2019 Africa Cup of Nations players